The following lists events that happened during 2013 in Oman.

Incumbents
Sultan: Qaboos bin Said al Said

Events

May
 May 1 - Flash floods leave 16 people dead and 3 others missing in Saudi Arabia, with authorities urging citizens to avoid low-lying wadis. At least two others were killed in neighboring Oman in some of the heaviest rainfall in more than 25 years.

References

 
2010s in Oman
Years of the 21st century in Oman
Oman
Oman